Hrafske is a village in Chuhuiv Raion, Kharkiv Oblast (province) of Ukraine.

History
In 1928, the Hrafske was renamed Radianske. In 2016, the village was renamed to Hrafske.

Until 18 July 2020, Hrafske was located in Vovchansk Raion. The raion was abolished on that day as part of the administrative reform of Ukraine, which reduced the number of raions of Kharkiv Oblast to seven.

References

Villages in Chuhuiv Raion